denotes the first female minister of that particular department.
Bold denotes incumbent female minister.

See also
Cabinet
Cabinet of Indonesia
Politics of Indonesia

External links
 List of female cabinet ministers of Indonesia

Ministers
Women
Indonesia
Ministers
Cabinet